CM-11 may refer to the following articles:

 CM-11 Brave Tiger, Taiwan military tank.
 USS Salem (CM-11), cargo ship, which acted as a minelayer during World War II.